The inaugural Australian Baseball League championship was won by the Waverley Reds coached by Phil Dale who defeated cross-town rivals the Melbourne Monarchs 3–1 in the 4 game championship series.

All-Star game

Teams

Source:

Ladder

Source:

Championship series

Final Series: Game 1: 1st Vs 2nd at Waverley Park

Final Series: Game 2: 1st Vs 2nd at Waverley Park

Final Series: Game 3: 1st Vs 2nd at Melbourne Ballpark

Final Series: Game 4: 1st Vs 2nd at Melbourne Ballpark

Awards

Source:

Top Stats

Source:

All-Star Team

Source: 

Australian Baseball League (1989–1999) seasons
1989 in Australian baseball
1990 in Australian baseball